The Ergischhorn is a mountain in the Pennine Alps in Switzerland.

External links
 List of mountains above 2000 m in Switzerland with coordinates

Mountains of the Alps
Mountains of Valais
Mountains of Switzerland
Two-thousanders of Switzerland